Area code 770 is a telephone area code in the North American Numbering Plan (NANP) serving all or part of 29 counties in North Georgia, including most of Atlanta's suburbs. It was created in 1995 in a split of numbering plan area (NPA) 404.

History
When the North American Numbering Plan was created in October 1947, all of Georgia was served by area code 404. In 1954, 404 was reduced to the northern half of the state, with Macon and points south splitting off as area code 912. The remaining 404 territory remained unchanged until 1992, when most of the area outside of the immediate Atlanta metropolitan area was split off with area code 706. This was intended as a long-term solution to relieve number shortages in exchanges in North Georgia. 

When 706 was created, it included several fast-growing exurbs of Atlanta. Residents of these areas complained about no longer being associated with the better-known area code 404, prompting BellSouth to return these areas to 404 soon after the split. However, even before the creation of 706, 404 was close to exhaustion due to the proliferation of cell phones, fax machines, and pagers in the fast-growing Atlanta area. BellSouth and the Georgia Public Service Commission were well aware of this, and had already planned to create a new area code for the Atlanta suburbs later in the decade. However, the restoration of the exurban areas from 706 forced further relief action sooner than anticipated.

As a result, just three years later, in 1995, almost all of Atlanta's suburban ring was split off as area code 770.

Atlanta was the first city in the United States to have mandatory ten-digit dialing throughout its metro area, roughly coinciding with the 1996 Summer Olympics in Atlanta. Atlanta was used as the test case not only for its size, but also because it enjoyed the world's largest fiber optic bundle at the time (five times that of New York), and it was home to BellSouth (now part of AT&T), then the Southeastern Regional Bell Operating Company.

An additional NPA will be added to both metro Atlanta overlay areas in 2022.  Area code 943 will be effective on March 15, 2022.

Service area
Numbering plan area 770 completely surrounds 404.  The two plan areas are separated roughly by Interstate 285, known locally as the Perimeter.  Generally, 770 includes most of the metro area outside the Perimeter, while 404 serves Atlanta itself and most suburbs inside the Perimeter; a few cities are split between the two codes.  Both codes are overlaid by 678, 470, and 943. The metro Atlanta region (404, 770, 678, 470, 943, and parts of 706/762 and 256/938) is a local calling area, and no long-distance charges are applied for calls from one portion of the metro to the other.

When the Atlanta area was originally divided in 1995, most cellphones stayed with 404, which balanced the fact that most of the landline area went to 770.

Area code 770 serves a numbering plan area that comprises the counties of Barrow, Bartow, Butts, Carroll, Cherokee, Clayton (part with area code 404), Cobb, Coweta, Dawson, DeKalb (part with area code 404), Douglas, Fayette, Forsyth, Fulton (part with area code 404), Gwinnett, Hall, Haralson, Heard (part with area codes 706 and 762), Henry, Lamar, Meriwether (part with area codes 706 and 762), Newton, Oconee, Paulding, Pike, Polk, Rockdale, Spalding, and Walton.

See also
 List of NANP area codes
 Metro Atlanta

References

External links
 NANPA Area Code Map of Georgia
 Interactive Map of Area Code 770
 List of exchanges from AreaCodeDownload.com, 770 Area Code

1995 establishments in Georgia (U.S. state)
Area codes in the United States
Area codes in Georgia (U.S. state)